A tu per tu is a 1984 Italian comedy film directed by Sergio Corbucci.

Plot summary 
In Milan, Emanuele is a rich owner who cheats finance; so he is hunted. As happened while he is running away, Emanuele meets poor and bungling taxi driver Gino. Emanuele contrives all the ways to fool the shy Gino, and he put the finances on his trail, while the other thinks for the future to have fun and continue to hide with his girlfriend. But Emanuele, when he discovers that Gino is really in trouble, decides to help him, and so he becomes a poor taxi driver, while Gino a rich and happy man: director of some properties in South Africa.

Cast 
 Paolo Villaggio as Gino Sciaccaluga
 Johnny Dorelli as  Emanuele Sansoni/Enrichetta Sansoni
 Marisa Laurito as  Elvira Sciaccaluga
 Adriano Pappalardo as the carabiniere
 Giuliana Calandra as Patrizia
 Franco Ressel as the  notary
  as  lover of Emanuele
  as  Solange
 Salvatore Borgese as  Mafiosi leader
 Tracy Spencer as  Tracy
 Lucio Rosato as Barzilai
 Moana Pozzi as blonde girl on the yacht

References

External links

1984 films
Italian comedy films
1984 comedy films
Films directed by Sergio Corbucci
Films about businesspeople
Films with screenplays by Luciano Vincenzoni
Films with screenplays by Sergio Donati
Films set in Milan
1980s Italian films
1980s Italian-language films